KZRK-FM (107.9 FM, "Rock 108") is a radio station serving the Amarillo, Texas area with an active rock format. This station broadcasts on FM frequency 107.9 MHz and is under ownership of Cumulus Media.  Its studios are located at the Amarillo Building downtown on Polk Street, and its transmitter tower is based west of Amarillo in unincorporated Potter County.

External links

ZRK-FM
Cumulus Media radio stations